Samuel Chew may refer to:

Samuel Chew (justice) (1693–1743), physician, Chief Justice of colonial Delaware
Samuel Chew (captain) (1750–1778), American officer in the Continental Navy
Samuel Claggett Chew (1888–1960), American literary scholar
Sam Chew Jr., American actor